The women's singles of the 1998 Skoda Czech Open tournament  was played on clay in Prague, Czech Republic.

Joannette Kruger was the defending champion but lost in the first round to Virginia Ruano Pascual.

Jana Novotná won in the final 6–3, 6–0 against Sandrine Testud.

Seeds
A champion seed is indicated in bold text while text in italics indicates the round in which that seed was eliminated.

  Jana Novotná (champion)
  Sandrine Testud (final)
  Joannette Kruger (first round)
  Natasha Zvereva (semifinals)
  Henrieta Nagyová (semifinals)
  Silvia Farina (quarterfinals)
  Ruxandra Dragomir (second round)
  Amélie Mauresmo (quarterfinals)

Draw

External links
 1998 Skoda Czech Open draw

1998 - Singles
Singles